The 2018–19 C.D. Guadalajara season is the 112nd season in the football club's history and the 94th consecutive season in the top flight of Mexican football.  In addition to the Liga MX and Copa MX, the club will also compete in the FIFA Club World Cup.

Coaching staff

Players

Squad information

Players and squad numbers last updated on 18 January 2019.Note: Flags indicate national team as has been defined under FIFA eligibility rules. Players may hold more than one non-FIFA nationality.

Competitions

Overview

Torneo Apertura

League table

Results summary

Result round by round

Matches

Apertura Copa MX

Group stage

Round of 16

FIFA Club World Cup

Quarter-finals

Match for fifth place

Torneo Clausura

League table

Results summary

Result round by round

Matches

Clausura Copa MX

Group stage

Statistics

Goals

Clean sheets

References

External links

Mexican football clubs 2018–19 season
C.D. Guadalajara seasons
Guadalajara